The Thon or Ton is a small river in northern France. It is a tributary of the river Oise, which flows into the Seine. It crosses the Ardennes and Aisne departments and is the central river of the Thiérache.

References

Rivers of France
Rivers of Grand Est
Rivers of Hauts-de-France
Rivers of Aisne
Rivers of Ardennes (department)
Thiérache